Coccothrinax inaguensis, the thatch palm or Inagua silver palm, is a palm which is endemic to the Bahamas.

Henderson and colleagues also considered Coccothrinax victorini to be a possible conspecific.  If that is the case, the name C. victorini should be applied to the combined species, since that name was the first to be published.

References

inaguensis
Trees of the Bahamas
Data deficient plants
Plants described in 1966